In some fishes, the palatoquadrate is the dorsal component of the mandibular arch, the ventral one being Meckel's cartilage. The palatoquadrate forms from splanchnocranium in various chordates including placoderms and acanthodians.

See also 

 Hyomandibula
 Fish anatomy
 Helicoprion

References 

 

Fish anatomy